Khalij is an Arabic word meaning a "gulf" and may refer to:
the Persian Gulf, located between Iran and the Arabian Peninsula
the Khalij el-Arab or Arab's Gulf, a large bay to the west of Alexandria in Egypt
the Khalīj 'Adan or Gulf of Aden, a gulf between Yemen and Somalia
the Khalij Qabis or Gulf of Gabès, a gulf on the eastern coast of Tunisia
 Khalij (album), a 1990 album by Iranian singer Ebi